Berge Østenstad (born 15 September 1964) is a Norwegian chess player and Norway's sixth International Grandmaster. Østenstad plays for the chess club in Asker. He appears on the official FIDE rating list as "Ostenstad, Berge".

, Østenstad has won more Norwegian Chess Championships than any other player, eight in total. He won in 1984, 1990, 1994, 1997, 1999, 2003, 2004 and 2011. He played for Norway in the Chess Olympiads of 1984, 1990 and 2004.

Østenstad gained the title of International Master in 1987. He achieved his first GM norm in Gausdal in 1990, his second in Biel in 1990 and the third in Gothenburg in 2003. His rating peaked the required 2500 in 1991. The Biel norm came after FIDE liberalized the requirements for GM norms by allowing them to be achieved before the tournament ended, and made these changes retroactive.

References 

Hansen, Victor (2003). "Vår neste stormester". Norsk Sjakkblad nr.1 2003, p. 4

External links 

1964 births
Living people
Chess grandmasters
Norwegian chess players
Chess Olympiad competitors